Charles "Chip" Lawrence is an American bioinformatician and mathematician, who is the pioneer in developing novel statistical approaches to biological sequence analysis.

After his PhD graduation, Lawrence became the assistant professor in Systems Engineering and Operations Research and Statistics, in Rensselaer Polytechnic Institute. In the same time period of time (1971–1975), Lawrence worked as the consultant to the Ministry of Maternal and Child Health in Dominican Republic. From 1975 to 1981, he worked in the New York State Department of Health as the Director of Operations Research and Statistics, in the Division of Epidemiology.

Now, he is the Professor of Applied Mathematics and Center for computational Molecular Biology, at Brown University. From 2004 to 2006, he was the director of the Center for Computational Biology. Now he is the director of the Statistical Molecular Biology Group (SMBG), at Brown University.

Lawrence's key scientific works to date are focusing on algorithmic approaches to biological sequence analysis. In fact, he was one of the first to recognize that the inherent statistical nature of genomic processes and the immense data resulting from genomic sequencing projects could only be fully analyzed by using statistical algorithms.

Early life and education
Lawrence got his bachelor's degree in 1967, in Rensselaer Polytechnic Institute, majoring in physics.

After the graduation from Rensselaer Polytechnic Institute, he pursued further education in Cornell University and moved to another research field: Applied Operation Research and Statistics in Environmental Engineering. He finished his PhD in 1971. His dissertation topic is population dynamics.

Lawrence did not switch to bioinformatics until he finished his PhD study.

Research interests and contributions
Since the 1980s, Lawrence started the research in the field of computational biology. focusing on algorithmic approaches, he was a pioneer in developing novel statistical approaches to biological sequence analysis.

Gibbs sampling in motif finding
Lawrence has particular contributions in the development of sequence alignment algorithms, which is approaching the modif finding problem by integrating the Bayesian statistics and Gibbs sampling strategy. In his seminal paper published in Science in 1993, the first application of the statistical technique Gibbs sampling to the problem of multiple sequence alignment was described and clearly illustrated.

Besides, Lawrence collaborated with others to further develop the Bayesian statistical approaches to RNA secondary structure prediction, which greatly facilitate the  predictions on the full ensemble of probable structures that an RNA molecule may adopt.

Lawrence researches the application of Bayesian algorithms,  specifically in the statistical approaches for the understanding of biological problems, with particular interest in transcription regulation and identification of regulatory motifs in sequences, antisense oligonucleotide and siRNA design, comparative genomics, the composition of nucleotide sequences and detailed analyses of several protein families.

Software and platforms
In the past several years, based on the statistical algorithm development by Lawrence and his collaborators, several programs have also been publicly available and widely used, such as the Gibbs Motif Sampler, the Bayes aligner, Sfold, BALSA, Gibbs Gaussian Clustering, and Bayesian Motif Clustering. His work in Bayesian Statistics won the Mitchell Prize for outstanding applied Bayesian statistics paper in 2000.

Chip Lawrence Lab
Lawrence became the director of Chip Lawrence Lab at Brown University. Their work is more focused on the applications of the high-D inferences in the biological problems such as the regulatory motif finding, RNAsecondary structure prediction, and genome wide studies of epigenetics; besides, his research interests also expanded into the geoscience areas of change point estimators of paleoclimate records and probabilistic alignment of geological stratigraphic sequences. The application models of stochastic grammars is also studied in Chip Lawrence Lab.

Teaching and traineeship
Lawrence has also devoted time to education.

He developed a tutorial on Bayesian statistics and Gibbs sampling, as well as the introduction courses in Bayesian statistics at Brown University.

Lawrence has mentored several young investigators before he took the job at Brown University. From 1981 to 2003, he worked as the Chief in Wadsworth Center for Laboratories and Research, New York State Department of Health, many young bioinformaticians were trained by him, such as Stephen Bryant.

Dr. Bryant now is the senior Investigator in National Center for Biotechnology Information, National Library of Medicine, and National Institutes of Health, working in the branch of computational biology. His focus is in the area of structural bioinformatics. Dr. Bryant also leads NCBI information resource teams in protein structure, protein family classification, and cheminformatics. These teams maintain NCBI's macromolecular structure database and Cn3D visualization tool, the Conserved Domain Database and CDTree analysis tool, and most recently the PubChem cheminformatics database and associated analysis tools.

Career summary
1971–1975: Assistant Professor, Systems Engineering and Operations Research and Statistics, Rensselaer Polytechnic Institute.
1971–1975: Consultant to the Ministry of Maternal and Child Health, Dominican Republic.
1975–1981: Director of Operations Research and Statistics, Division of Epidemiology, New York State Department of Health.
1981–2003: Chief of the Biometrics/Bioinformatics Laboratory, Wadsworth Center for Laboratories and Research, New York State Department of Health.
1985–1992: Statistical Consultant, Harrison Radiator Division General Motors Corp.
1992–1996: Visiting Scientist, National Center for Biotechnology Information, NLM-NIH.
2000–2003: Research Professor, Computer Science Department, Rensselaer Polytechnic Institute (one day per week).
2004–2006: Director of the Center for Computational Molecular Biology, and Professor of Applied Mathematics, Brown University.
2004–present: Professor of Applied Mathematics and Center for Computational Molecular Biology, Brown University.

References

External links
Faculty page at Brown University

20th-century American mathematicians
21st-century American mathematicians
American bioinformaticians
Rensselaer Polytechnic Institute alumni
Cornell University alumni
Brown University faculty
Living people
Year of birth missing (living people)
Place of birth missing (living people)